El Ksour is a town and commune in the Kef Governorate, Tunisia. As of 2004 it had a population of 5,357.
The Ancient Roman site Vicus Maracitanus is located to the south. The town contains some fine Berber architecture.

See also
List of cities in Tunisia

References

Populated places in Tunisia
Communes of Tunisia